Weigel Motors Ltd was a British automobile manufacturer from 1907–1910 at Coswell Road in London. The company built the first British cars to participate in Grand Prix Racing when it entered 2 cars in the 1907 French Grand Prix at Dieppe,  driven by Gregor Laxen and Pryce Harrison. These were powered by Straight Eight engines displacing 14,866cc, formed by coupling two 40 hp engines in tandem. Financial difficulties emerged in 1907, as the company was reformed, and moved to a new factory in Olaf Street, Latimer Road, Notting Hill. For the 1908 French Grand Prix Weigel entered three four-cylinder cars, with engines displacing 12,781cc driven by Harrison, Laxen and Shannon. Again, none of the cars finished. The firm's assets were acquired in 1910 by Crowdy Limited, who continued manufacture of cars in the Olaf Street works, at first merely continuing the existing 25 hp and 40 hp Weigel designs and later producing a 19 hp four and a 29 hp six with dashboard radiators similar to those on Renault cars of the era. At the end of 1911 they moved to West Heath Works, Northfield, Birmingham producing cars with normally-located radiators, before going out of business.

Models

References

 David Culshaw & Peter Horrobin: The Complete Catalogue of British Cars 1895–1975. Veloce Publishing plc. Dorchester (1999).

External links
 Weigel, Unique Cars and Parts USA, retrieved 2013-03-30

Defunct motor vehicle manufacturers of England
Motor vehicle manufacturers based in London
British racecar constructors